The 1992–93 Football League Cup (known as the Coca-Cola Cup for sponsorship reasons) was the 33rd Football League Cup, a knockout competition for England's top 92 football clubs. The competition name reflects a sponsorship deal with soft drink brand Coca-Cola.
Arsenal won the competition, beating Sheffield Wednesday 2–1 in the final.

First round
56 of the First, Second and Third Division clubs compete from the First Round. Each section is divided equally into a pot of seeded clubs and a pot of unseeded clubs. Clubs' rankings depend upon their finishing position in the 1991–92 season. Reading received a bye to the second round of the competition, as they had been drawn to play Maidstone United, who resigned from the Football League on 17 August due to financial problems.

First Leg

Second Leg

Second round
First leg matches were played between 21 and 23 September, with most of the second leg matches being played between 6 and 7 October with one of them being played on 27 October.

First Leg

Second Leg

Third round
Most matches in the third round were played on 27 and 28 October with one match being played between 10 November. Four replays were played between 10 November and 1 December.

Ties

Replays

Fourth round
Most fourth round matches were played between 1 and 9 December with one match being played on 6 January. Three replays were played between 15 and 16 December.

Ties

Replays

Quarter-finals
The quarter-final matches were played between 6 and 19 January with one replay being played on 3 February.

Ties

Replay

Semi-finals
The semi-final draw was made after the conclusion of the quarter finals. Unlike the other rounds, the semi-final ties were played over two legs, with each team playing one leg at home and one away. Arsenal comfortably overcame Crystal Palace, with Ian Wright scoring in both legs against his old club, while Sheffield Wednesday overcame Blackburn Rovers in the other leg by a similar margin.

First leg

Second leg

Arsenal won 5–1 on aggregate.

Sheffield Wednesday won 6–3 on aggregate.

Final

References

General

Specific

EFL Cup seasons
1992–93 domestic association football cups
Lea
Cup